Barbara Reid (born November 16, 1957) is a Canadian illustrator and author of children's books. She has been called "one of Canada's major literary figures".

She was born in Toronto, Ontario and studied at the Ontario College of Art. She began her career creating illustrations for textbooks.

She creates her illustrations by starting with a pencil drawing. She then builds up the image using coloured modelling clay to give it a three-dimensional effect. The result is then photographed and used as an illustration.

Her work has been published in over 21 countries, including Canada, the United States, Great Britain, Australia, New Zealand, Finland, Norway, China, Germany, Brazil and Thailand. In 2012, she received the Vicky Metcalf Award for Literature for Young People. Her Zoe series of books received a Mr. Christie's Book Award.

Selected works 
 The New Baby Calf (1984), text by Edith Newlin Chase
 Have You Seen Birds? (1986), text by Joanne Oppenheim, received the Canada Council Children's Literature Prize and the Elizabeth Mrazik-Cleaver Canadian Picture Book Award
 Sing a Song of Mother Goose (1987)
 Playing with Plasticine (1988), non-fiction
 Effie (1990), text by Bev Allinson
 Two By Two (1992), won the Elizabeth Mrazik-Cleaver Canadian Picture Book Award
 Zoe's Year (1992)
 Gifts (1994), text by Jo Ellen Bogart
 The Party (1997), received the Governor General's Award for English-language children's illustration
 Fun with Modeling Clay (1998), non-fiction
 The Golden Goose (2000)
 The Subway Mouse (2004), nominated for a Governor General's Award, received the Ruth and Sylvia Schwartz Children's Book Award
 Read Me a Book (2004)
 Fox Walked Alone (2009), named to the International Board on Books for Young People International Honour List
 Perfect Snow (2009), received the Amelia Frances Howard-Gibbon Illustrator's Award
 Picture a Tree (2011), nominated for a Governor General's Award
 Welcome Baby (2013)
 The Night Before Christmas (2013)

References

External links 
 
 Archives of Barbara Reid (Barbara Reid fonds, R11795) are held at Library and Archives Canada

1957 births
Living people
Governor General's Award-winning children's illustrators
Canadian women children's writers
Writers from Toronto